Neussargues-Moissac (Auvergnat: Nuçargues e Moissac)  is a former commune in the Cantal department in south-central France. On 1 December 2016, it was merged into the new commune Neussargues en Pinatelle.

Population

Sights
 Château St Benoît: owned by the family of Olivier Messiaen's first wife, Claire Delbos. Messiaen worked on L'Ascension there.
 Castle Marguerite (Villa ou Château Marguerite): 19th century building.
The Valley of Alagnon
 Villa Marguerite: late 19th-century French mansion.
The river Alagnon is tributary of the Allier.

Personalities
 Olivier Messiaen
 Claire Delbos, violinist, first wife of the composer Olivier Messiaen.

See also
Communes of the Cantal department

References

External links

 about Mr. Maurice Guibal Murat at the end of the 19th century: a city, a mayor, a newspaper by Jean-Louis Philippart
 http://www.neussargues-moissac.fr/gb_patrimoine.htm
 Volcano Park of Auvergne on the UNEP-WCMC site
Infography about Olivier Messiaen
 Albepierre-Bredons

Former communes of Cantal
Cantal communes articles needing translation from French Wikipedia
Populated places disestablished in 2016